Rice-Oxley is a surname. Notable people with the surname include:
Alan Rice-Oxley (1896–1961), British World War I flying ace
Mark Rice-Oxley (born 1969), British journalist, editor and columnist at The Guardian newspaper
Tim Rice-Oxley (born 1976), British musician, producer, singer, multi-instrumentalist and member of the band Keane

See also
Rice (surname)
Oxley (surname)

Compound surnames
English-language surnames